James Baugh "Sunny Jim" Mallory III (September 1, 1918 – August 6, 2001) was an American football coach and baseball player. Mallory was the head football coach at Elon University from 1948 to 1952, compiling a record of 28–18–3. He attended the University of North Carolina. Mallory died in 2001.

Head coaching record

Football

References

External links
 
 

1918 births
2001 deaths
Major League Baseball outfielders
New York Giants (NL) players
St. Louis Cardinals players
Washington Senators (1901–1960) players
Burlington Bees players
Charlotte Hornets (baseball) players
Columbus Red Birds players
Greensboro Patriots players
East Carolina Pirates baseball coaches
Elon Phoenix baseball coaches
Elon Phoenix football coaches
North Carolina Tar Heels football players
People from Lawrenceville, Virginia
Players of American football from Virginia
Baseball players from Virginia